Jeff Stone may refer to:
Jeff Stone (author) (active since 2003), American author of Kung Fu themed books for children
Jeff Stone (baseball) (born 1960), American former baseball outfielder
Jeff Stone (American politician, born 1956) (born 1956), American politician in the California State Senate (2014–2019) and Nevada State Senate (2023–present)
Jeff Stone (Wisconsin politician) (born 1961), American politician in Wisconsin State Assembly
B. Jeff Stone (1936–2011), American rockabilly and country singer
Jeffrey Stone (1926–2012), American actor and voice-over artist

See also 
Jefferson Pier or Jefferson Stone, marking the second prime meridian of the United States
Jeff Stone, a character in the American television series The Donna Reed Show (1958–1966), played by Paul Petersen